Paralarinia is a genus of African orb-weaver spiders first described by M. Grasshoff in 1970.

Species
 it contains four species:
Paralarinia agnata Grasshoff, 1970 – Congo
Paralarinia bartelsi (Lessert, 1933) – South Africa
Paralarinia denisi (Lessert, 1938) – Congo
Paralarinia incerta (Tullgren, 1910) – Central, East Africa

References

Araneidae
Araneomorphae genera
Spiders of Africa